Chah Varz (also Romanized as Chāh Varz; also known as Chāh Vard) is a city in Chah Varz District, in the Lamerd County, Fars Province, Iran. At the 2006 census, its population was 2,640, in 521 families.

Chah Varz is located about 300 km south of provincial capital city of Shiraz. It has a tropical climate and contains historical places. It is located near one of the biggest natural gas sites (Azadegan).

Etymology 
Chah Varz's name is different in historical books, as "Chah Vard" or "Chah Bord".
Ali-Akbar Dehkhoda wrote Chah Varz's name in the Dehkhoda Dictionary as "Chah Varzd," "Chah" meaning "water well" and "Vard" meaning Flower, translating to "Well of Flower."

Old Arabic authors wrote Chah Varz's name as "Chah Bord", meaning "Well of Rock" in English.

Old Chah Varzian people say the name was "Chah Varzā," which translates to "Well of Ox," saying the reason for this refers to the people of the town bringing oxen to retrieve water from the well.

References 

Populated places in Lamerd County
Cities in Fars Province